Popularly referred to as "Arch Madness", the 2009 Missouri Valley Conference men's basketball tournament as part of the 2008–09 NCAA Division I men's basketball season was played in St. Louis, Missouri March 5–8, 2009. The tournament was won by the Northern Iowa Panthers, who will receive the Missouri Valley Conference's automatic bid to the 2009 NCAA Men's Division I Basketball Tournament.

Tournament Bracket

External links
http://www.mvc.org/mbb/mbb_bracket.pdf

-2009 Missouri Valley Conference men's basketball tournament
Missouri Valley Conference men's basketball tournament
2009 in sports in  Missouri